Oleg Yashchuk (born 26 October 1977) is a Ukrainian former professional footballer who played as a forward. He spent most of his career in Belgium and also holds the Belgian nationality. His last name is sometimes transliterated as Iachtchouk or Jasjtsjoek. He now coaches the U14 division of R.S.C. Anderlecht.

Club career
Iachtchouk was born in Hrybova (Hrynky Rural-rada), Lanivtsi Raion, Ternopil Oblast then Ukrainian SSR. He first made a name for himself in the Ukrainian Premier League in the 1995–96 season. Playing for an unfashionable FC Nyva Ternopil side, then a 17-year-old, on matchday 1 he scored a hat trick at Shakhtar Donetsk helping his side to a shock 4–2 away win. He finished the season as the club's top scorer with ten goals as Nyva narrowly avoided relegation.

Iachtchouk's talent caught the eye of Anderlecht and he signed for the Belgian club at the end of the season. He made a good start in the first team in the 1990s but then became injured for long periods of time. In some seasons he barely played at all because of recurring injuries, yet Anderlecht extended his contract in 2001 for another five years. In 2006, he left the club, having played 119 league matches and scored 31 goals during ten seasons.

He signed for Ergotelis in Greece for the 2006–07 season where he finally managed to shake off his injury problems.

On 14 June 2007, Iachtchouk returned to Belgium, signing a two-year contract with Cercle Brugge who had just appointed his former Anderlecht teammate Glen De Boeck as manager. In January 2009 his contract was extended until 2013, just days after he scored both of his team's goals in a 2–1 win against his former club Anderlecht.

International career
Iachtchouk has played for all of Ukraine's youth national teams (Under-16, Under-18 and Under-21), including a spell alongside Andriy Shevchenko for the Under-18s. In 1994, he became his team's best scorer at the European Under-16 Championship in Ireland where Ukraine finished third. One of the three goals Iachtchouk scored at the tournament was against Belgium.

However, Iachtchouk has not won a single full international cap due to persistent injuries. After he finally recovered he found that his dual Ukrainian/Belgian citizenship is a major obstacle to his call-up for Ukraine; while he did not see himself playing for his new home country.

Awards and honours
Anderlecht
 Belgian First Division: 1999–2000, 2000–01, 2003–04, 2005–06
 Belgian Supercup: 2000, 2001

Individual
 Ukraine top scorer at Euro Under-16: 1994
 Nyva Ternopil top scorer: 1995-96
 Cercle Brugge top scorer: 2007–08, 2008–09
 Cercle Brugge player of the season (Pop Poll d'Echte): 2008–09, 2009–10

See also
 Belgian nationality law
 Ukrainian citizenship

References

External links
 
 
 
 
 Profile at legioner.kulichki.com

1977 births
Living people
Ukrainian footballers
Belgian footballers
Association football forwards
Ukraine under-21 international footballers
Ukraine youth international footballers
FC Lviv (1992) players
FC Krystal Chortkiv players
FC Nyva Ternopil players
R.S.C. Anderlecht players
Cercle Brugge K.S.V. players
Ergotelis F.C. players
K.V.C. Westerlo players
Belgian Pro League players
Challenger Pro League players
Ukrainian Premier League players
Super League Greece players
Ukrainian expatriate footballers
Belgian expatriate footballers
Ukrainian expatriate sportspeople in Belgium
Expatriate footballers in Belgium
Ukrainian expatriate sportspeople in Greece
Expatriate footballers in Greece
Sportspeople from Ternopil Oblast